The following is a list of integrals (anti-derivative functions) of hyperbolic functions. For a complete list of integral functions, see list of integrals.

In all formulas the constant a is assumed to be nonzero, and C
denotes the constant of integration.

Integrals involving only hyperbolic sine functions

 also: 

 also:

Integrals involving only hyperbolic cosine functions

 also: 

 also: 

 or  times The Logistic Function

Other integrals

Integrals of hyperbolic tangent, cotangent, secant, cosecant functions

Integrals involving hyperbolic sine and cosine functions

 also:

Integrals involving hyperbolic and trigonometric functions

Exponentials
Hyperbolic functions